The West Farnam Apartments are located at 3817 Dewey Avenue in Midtown Omaha, Nebraska. The building was reportedly the first luxury apartment building constructed in Omaha.

Architecture
Built in 1912 from a design by locally renowned architect Frederick A. Henninger, the apartments were designated an Omaha Landmark on September 25, 1979. A contributing property to Omaha's Gold Coast neighborhood, the West Farnam was designed with many luxuries in a combined Italian Renaissance Revival and Prairie Style. The building originally featured an electric elevator, a hand-fired coal furnace, a row of steam-heated garages and a large flower garden.

References

Historic districts in Omaha, Nebraska
National Register of Historic Places in Omaha, Nebraska
Apartment buildings in Omaha, Nebraska
Prairie School architecture in Nebraska
Italian Renaissance Revival architecture in the United States
Residential buildings on the National Register of Historic Places in Nebraska
Historic district contributing properties in Nebraska